ABC Television Players is an American live television anthology that ran on ABC from January 16, 1949, through October 30, 1949.

The program was originally called ABC Television Players, then (beginning in April) ABC Tele-Players, and finally (beginning in August) ABC Penthouse Players.

The program was a series of 30-minute, live dramatic presentations, containing little-known actors.  It was narrated by Donald Gallaher, a Hollywood actor whose name was sometimes misspelled as Don Gallagher. The show was broadcast live from Chicago.

Episodes of the program included "Record of a Social Wreck" on June 26, 1949, and "The Betrayers" on June 5, 1949.

See also
1949-50 United States network television schedule

References

External links
ABC Television Players at IMDB
Television Players inc ABC, NBC, BBC

1940s American anthology television series
1949 American television series debuts
1949 American television series endings
American Broadcasting Company original programming
American live television series
Black-and-white American television shows
English-language television shows